Circaea × sterilis is a hybrid of flowering plants in the evening primrose family Onagraceae. The parents of the hybrid are Circaea alpina and Circaea canadensis.

References

sterilis
Plant nothospecies
Flora of North America